Gadia Lohars (also known as Gaduliya Lohars or Rajput Lohar) are a nomadic community of Uttar Pradesh, India. They are also found in the Malwa region of Madhya Pradesh. They are lohar (ironsmith) by profession  who move on from one place to another place on bullock carts, which in Hindi are called gadi, hence the name 'Gadia Lohar'. These Lohars are different from the Lohar clan of Iran, Pakistan and India. They usually make and repair agricultural and household implements.

Their forefathers were blacksmiths in the army and claim to be descendants of Maharana Pratap of Mewar. When Mewar fell to the Mughals and Maharana ran to forest these people meet maharana in forest. These people helped Maharana in forest and his family. They pledged never to return to their homeland, never to settle anywhere else and never to live under a roof until Maharana Pratap won Chittorgarh. Maharana Pratap did not win Chittor back and hence the lohars continued their pledge even today.

Title and Gotra in Gadia Lohar Rajput:
Parmar
Solanki
Sisodia
Dabhi
Devda
Borana
Kushwaha
Chaturvedi
Dadich
Koshik
Tiwari

Documentaries
A documentary on them entitled "Gadia Lohar: A Life and Livelihood in Question?" (Hindi/Mini DV/ 24 minutes / 2005/) was filmed by director Meenakshi Vinay Rai.

Another documentary is 
India's nomads: The forgotten world of the Gadia Lohar (Netflix, 2020) 52 minutes, by Deana Uppal.

See also
 Uttar Pradeshi people
 Romani people

Further reading
Cobas Puente, Esteban. The Gaduliya Lohars: India's wandering blacksmiths. UNESCO Courier, October 1984.
 Davindera, S. (1997). Socialization and Education of Nomad Children in Delhi State. Regency Publications. .

References

External links 

Lancaster, John. India's Lost Nomads. National Geographic, February 2010.
Photos of Gaduliya Lohars (Loupiote)

History of Rajasthan
Social groups of Rajasthan
Modern nomads